Mark Lionel Gertler (born March 31, 1951) is an American economist, and Henry and Lucy Moses Professor of Economics at New York University (NYU). A specialist in business cycles and monetary policy, he has been an associate and collaborator of Federal Reserve Chairman Ben Bernanke for more than 30 years. He is among the 20 most cited economists in the world.

Gertler completed his B.A. in May 1973 from the University of Wisconsin–Madison, and his Ph.D. in June 1978 from Stanford University. He worked at Cornell University and the University of Wisconsin–Madison before joining the faculty at NYU.

Gertler and Bernanke published "Should Central Banks Respond to Movements in Asset Prices?" in the American Economic Review in 2001, five years before Bernanke replaced Alan Greenspan as Chairman of the Federal Reserve Board of Governors. The paper, which deals retrospectively with the stock market bubble of the Internet years, has become a widely cited policy paper in economics, outside the field as well as within. Bernanke and Gertler argue that the practice of targeting inflation and price stability, as the Federal Reserve has done since the 1980s, should be continued, while the more aggressive approach of managing "asset price bubbles", which some economists have advocated, would be ineffective or counterproductive.

In 2020 he was awarded the BBVA Foundation Frontiers of Knowledge Award in the category "Economics, Finance and Management".

Gertler married Cara Lown, a Ph.D. economist, in 1991.

References

Further reading

 Interview with Mark Gertler (2013)
 Remarks by Governor Ben S. Bernanke (2002)
 CV of Mark L. Gertler
 Details about Mark Gertler

External links
 Personal web page
 Publications and Working Papers

1951 births
21st-century American economists
Cornell University faculty
Macroeconomists
New Keynesian economists
New York University faculty
Stanford University alumni
University of Wisconsin–Madison alumni
University of Wisconsin–Madison faculty
Living people
Fellows of the Econometric Society
Fellows of the American Academy of Arts and Sciences